Filiki Eteria or Society of Friends ( or ) was a secret organization founded in 1814 in Odessa, whose purpose was to overthrow the Ottoman rule of Greece and establish an independent Greek state. Society members were mainly young Phanariot Greeks from Constantinople and the Russian Empire, local political and military leaders from the Greek mainland and islands, as well as several Orthodox Christian leaders from other nations that were under Hellenic influence, such as Karađorđe from Serbia, Tudor Vladimirescu from Romania, and Arvanite military commanders. One of its leaders was the prominent Phanariote Prince Alexander Ypsilantis. The Society initiated the Greek War of Independence in the spring of 1821.

Translations and transliterations
The direct translation of the word "Φιλική" is "Friendly" and the direct translation of "Ἑταιρεία" is "Society", "Company" or "Association"). The common transliteration "Filiki Eteria" reflects the pronunciation of the name in modern Greek. Other possible transliterations are "Filike Etaireia", which reflects Greek orthography, and "Philike Hetaireia", which reflects the ancient Greek etymology. The word "friendly" here is meant to connote allies who work towards the same goal, not necessarily those who socialize together.

Foundation

In the context of ardent desire for independence from Turkish occupation, and with the explicit influence of similar secret societies elsewhere in Europe, three Greeks came together in 1814 in Odessa to decide the constitution for a secret organization in freemasonic fashion. Its purpose was to unite all Greeks in an armed organization to overthrow Turkish rule. The three founders were Nikolaos Skoufas from the Arta province, Emmanuil Xanthos from Patmos and Athanasios Tsakalov from Ioannina. Soon after they initiated a fourth member, Panagiotis Anagnostopoulos from Andritsaina.

Skoufas met with Konstantinos Rados, who was initiated into Carbonarism. Xanthos was initiated into a Freemasonic Lodge at Lefkada ("Society of Free Builders of Saint Mavra"), while Tsakalov was a founding member of the Hellenoglosso Xenodocheio (Greek: Ελληνόγλωσσο Ξενοδοχείο, meaning Greek-speaking Hotel) an earlier relative society for the liberation of Greece which had been founded in Paris and made a progress to the Greek nationalistic ideas.

At the start, between 1814 and 1816, there were roughly twenty members. During 1817, the society initiated members from the diaspora Greeks of Russia and the Danubian Principalities of Moldavia and Wallachia. The Prince of Moldavia Michael Soutzos himself, became a member. Massive initiations began only in 1818 and by early 1821, when the Society had expanded to almost all regions of Greece and throughout Greek communities abroad, the membership numbered in thousands. Among its members were tradesmen, clergy, Russian consuls, Ottoman officials from Phanar and revolutionary Serbs, most notably, the leader of the Serbian Revolution, father of the modern Serbia and founder of the Karadjordjevic dynasty Karageorge Petrovic. Members included primary instigators of the Greek revolution, notably Theodoros Kolokotronis, Odysseas Androutsos, Dimitris Plapoutas, Papaflessas and the metropolitan bishop Germanos of Patras.

Hierarchy and initiation

Filiki Eteria was strongly influenced by Carbonarism and Freemasonry. The team of leaders made and spread its decisions, saying that they transmitted the commands of an "Invisible Authority" (Αόρατος Αρχή), who was thought to be one or more strong persons, so that from the start it was shrouded in mystery, secrecy and glamour. It was generally believed that a lot of important personalities were members, not only eminent Greeks, but also notable foreigners such as the Tsar of Russia Alexander I. The reality was that initially, the Invisible Authority comprised only the three founders. From 1815 until 1818, five more were added to the Invisible Authority, and after the death of Skoufas three more. In 1818, the Invisible Authority was renamed to the "Authority of the Twelve Apostles" and each Apostle shouldered the responsibility of a separate region.

The organisational structure was pyramid-like, with the "Invisible Authority" coordinating from the top. No one knew or had the right to ask who created the organisation. Commands were carried out unquestioningly and members did not have the right to make decisions. Members of the society came together in what was called a "Temple" with four levels of initiation: a) Brothers (Αδελφοποίητοι) or Vlamides (Βλάμηδες), b) the Recommended (Συστημένοι), c) the Priests (Ιερείς) and d) the Shepherds (Ποιμένες). The Priests were charged with the duty of initiation.

When the Priest approached a new member, it was first to make sure of his patriotism and catechize him in the aims of the society; the last stage was to put him under the lengthy principal oath, called the Great Oath (Μέγας Όρκος). Much of the essence of it was contained in its conclusion:

When the above was administered the Priest then uttered the words of acceptance of the novice as a new member:

Afterwards the initiated were considered neophyte members of the society, with all the rights and obligations of this rank. The Priest immediately had the obligation to reveal all the marks of recognition between the Vlamides or Brothers. Vlamides and Recommended were unaware of the revolutionary aims of the organisation. They only knew that there existed a society that tried hard for the general good of the nation, which included in its ranks important personalities. This myth was propagated deliberately in order to stimulate the morale of members and also to make proselytism easier.

Members

Members in the secret society divided to three parts: a) Etairoi (society members), who had important duties, b) Apostles (advocates), who also had important duties, and c) all other members.

The following is a list of members of the Filiki Eteria in order of most initiations which they conducted:

Change of leadership

In 1818, the seat of Filiki Eteria had migrated from Odessa to Constantinople, and Skoufas' death had been a serious loss. The remaining founders attempted to find a major personality to take over the reins, one who would add prestige and fresh impetus to the society. In early 1818, they had a meeting with Ioannis Kapodistrias, who not only refused, but later wrote that he considered Filiki Eteria guilty for the havoc that was foreboded in Greece.

Alexandros Ypsilantis was contacted and asked to assume leadership of Filiki Eteria, which he did in April 1820. He began active preparations for a revolt and with the setting up of a military unit for the purpose that he named the Sacred Band. Various proposals were made for the location regarding the break out of the revolution. One of them was to be in Constantinople, the heart of the empire, that was the long-term target of the revolutionaries. Finally the decision that was taken was to start from the Peloponnese (Morea), and the Danubian Principalities for a feint at the same time. The society especially wanted to also take advantage of the involvement of significant Ottoman forces, including the pasha of the Moreas, against Ali Pasha of Ioannina.

See also
Ellinoglosso Xenodocheio
Filomousos Eteria
Marigo Zarafopoula

References

Further reading

 Vournas, Tasos. Friendly Society: her illegal organisational and persecution by the foreigners, Tolides Bros, (Athens 1982).
 Metropolitan of Old Patras Germanos, Memoirs, (Introductory note, index, ref. Ioanna Yiannaropoulos – Tassos Gritsopoulos), (Athens 1975).
 Kordatos, Yannis. Rigas Feraios and Balkan Federation, (Athens 1974).
 Xanthos, Emmanuil. Memoirs for the Friendly Society, (facsimile reprint of 1834 ed), Vergina, (Athens 1996).
 Michaletos, Ioannis. The History of a Greek Secret Society: Structure and Rites of the Philiki Etaireia, (www.balkanalysis.com 2007).